The Five Martyrs may refer to:

 The Five Martyrs of Shia Islam: five Shia Muslims executed by Sunni Muslims in different periods.
 The Five Martyrs of the League of Left-Wing Writers: five left-wing Chinese writers executed by the Kuomintang on 7 February 1931.